Ann Lesley Smith (born 1956 or 1957) is an American journalist and former prison chaplain, model, and singer-songwriter. 

After working in modelling, Smith was the host of the KFIV Ann Lesley Live radio show and worked as a Christian minister for the Manteca Police Department and the Marin County Sheriff's Office, before returning to journalism. 

She was married to Chester Smith until his death in 2008, and in 2023 got engaged to Australian-American newspaper magnate Rupert Murdoch. Smith lives in Northern California.

Early life 

Career 
Smith worked as a model, a radio journalist and as as singer-songwriter in San Francisco. She ran the radio show Ann Lesley Live on KFIV. Later she worked as a christian minister doing prison chaplaincy for the Manteca Police Department and the Marin County Sheriff's Office, before returning to journalism, working for Rupert Murdoch's newspaper group.

She is the founder of Angels All Over non profit organisation that supports people experiencing homelessness.

Personal life 

Smith lives on her ranch in northern California, which has a commercial vineyard and olive production.

She was married to American musician and radio and television broadcaster Chester Smith until his death in 2008. The couple released the Captured by Love album in 2005.

Prior to that she was married to a member of the Huntington railroad family. She got engaged to Australian-American business magnate Rupert Murdoch on March 17, 2023 in New York City. The couple met at his Moraga Estate, winery in Bel Air, California.

See also 

 Jerry Hall

References 

1950s births
American radio personalities
Journalists from California
Prison chaplains
American religious workers
American models
20th-century American women musicians
21st-century American women musicians
Organization founders
Women founders
American winemakers
American songwriters
Songwriters from California
American female winemakers
IHeartMedia